The Indian Naval Air Arm is the aviation branch and a fighting arm of the Indian Navy which is tasked to provide an aircraft carrier based strike capability, fleet air defence, maritime reconnaissance, and anti-submarine warfare.

The Flag Officer Naval Aviation (FONA) appears to direct the field operations of the air arm.

History

The first naval air station, INS Garuda, was inaugurated in Cochin on 11 May 1953. This went hand-in-hand with the commissioning of the No.550 Squadron, utilising Short Sealand aircraft and Fairey Firefly aircraft

1960 saw the No.300 White Tigers Squadron, consisting of Sea Hawks aircraft being commissioned.

In the very next year (1961),  (formerly HMS Hercules) was acquired by the Indian Navy. Vikrants initial airwing consisted of British Hawker Sea Hawk fighter-bombers and a French Alize anti-submarine aircraft. On 18 May 1961, the first jet landed on board, piloted by Lieutenant (later Admiral) R H Tahiliani. That year, the No.310 Cobras Squadron (consisting of Alize aircraft) was commissioned. After playing an important role in several major Indian military actions, specifically the liberation of Goa and the India-Pakistan war in 1971, she was decommissioned in January 1997 and turned into a museum ship.

In 1976, the Indian Air Force handed over Super Constellation aircraft to the No.312 Albatross Squadron in Dabolim, Goa. Being fairly old aircraft at that point, these were withdrawn from active service by 1983. To replace them in the maritime patrol role, Soviet aircraft were acquired. The No. 315 Winged Stallions Squadron was commissioned in 1977 with the Ilyushin Il-38 aircraft.

In December 1961, INS Vikrant participated in Operation Vijay, the liberation of Goa from Portugal. Its role was primarily to deter foreign naval intervention during the 40-hour-long military action.

INS Vikrant played a major role in the successful naval blockade of East Pakistan. That evening, the air group struck Chittagong harbour. Other strikes targeted Khulna and Mongla. A PTI message is supposed to have read, "Chittagong harbour ablaze as ships and aircraft of the (Pakistan) Eastern Naval Fleet bombed and rocketed. Not a single vessel can be put to sea from Chittagong". Air strikes staged from Vikrant continued till 10 December 1971.

Given naval intelligence that indicated the intent of the Pakistan Navy to break through the Indian Naval blockade using camouflaged merchant ships, Vikrants Sea Hawks struck shipping in the Chittagong and Cox's Bazar harbours, sinking or incapacitating most merchant ships there.

The Hughes 269 helicopter was previously in service for training.

The BAE Sea Harrier FRS Mk.51 / T Mk.60 flew with the INAS 300 and INAS 552 squadrons of the Indian Navy. The Sea Harriers are armed with the Matra Magic-II AAM and the Sea Eagle Anti-ship missiles. The aircraft were upgraded with the Elta EL/M-2032 radar and the Rafael Derby BVRAAM missiles.

Year 1988 saw the induction of Tupolev 142M into service. The aircraft started operations from Dabolim in Goa and later shifted its operations to INS Rajali in 1992. Tu-142M was primarily used in the long-range maritime reconnaissance and anti-submarine warfare role. The aircraft served the navy till 2018 and participated in the Indian Peace Keeping Mission in Sri Lanka. Also participated in Operation Cactus in Maldives, in which the fleeing mercenaries were detected and tracked until apprehended by ships.

On 11 May 2013, first squadron of MiG-29K was commissioned which mark the another milestone in naval aviation. These aircraft were commissioned as a replacement of ageing Sea Harrier.

The Naval Aviation Museum located in Bogmalo,  from Vasco da Gama, Goa, India showcases the history of the Naval Air Arm.

Aircraft inventory

Fixed-wing aircraft

Mikoyan MiG-29K
 Indian Navy to acquire the Soviet aircraft carrier Admiral Gorshkov. As reported by MiG Bureau, the Indian Navy's association with the MiG-29K began in Apr 2002 when a team led by Commander Gupta reached Moscow to evaluate the MiG-29K prototype for possible induction into the Indian Navy. The Team evaluated the aircraft on ground as well as in the air (the flight evaluation was conducted by a Navy Test Pilot Commander Ahuja). Some other aircraft were also evaluated but the MiG-29K was chosen. On 20 January 2004, the Indian Navy signed a contract for 12 single-seat MiG-29K and 4 two-seat MiG-29KUB. The first MIG-29K for the Indian Navy took flight on 22 January 2007. The MIG-29 KUB (two-seat trainer) is similar to the MIG-29K but with reduced operational range. The aircraft will be fielded on the aircraft carrier INS Vikramaditya.

The first squadron, INAS 303, the "Black Panthers", was commissioned on 11 May 2013. On 11 July 2016, second squadron, INAS 300, was commissioned. The delivery of the aircraft to the Indian Navy started in 2009.

The fighter plane is different from the MiG-29 flown by Indian Air Force. The aircraft has been modified for aircraft carrier operation by hardening the undercarriage. It also has much better 'over-the-nose' vision to make it easy to land aboard a carrier at a high angle of attack. With special coatings, the MiG-29K radar reflecting surface is 4–5 times smaller than of basic MiG-29. Cockpit displays consist of wide HUDs, 3 colour LCD MFDs (7 on the MiG-29KUB), a French Sigma-95 satellite GPS module and Topsight E helmet-mounted targeting system compatible with the full range of weapons carried by the MiG-29M and MiG-29SMT.

Boeing P-8I Neptune

New Delhi and Boeing have signed a $2.1 billion contract to deliver 12 P-8I Neptune for anti-submarine operations. The new aircraft will replace a fleet of Russian-manufactured Tupolev-142M planes. P-8I varies from the P-8A, with the Magnetic anomaly detector (MAD) has been kept intact while an aft-mounted radar provides 360-degree aerial radar surveillance capability. Many of the communication and other devices on-board are developed by Bharat Electronics Limited. The first squadron was formed with eight aircraft. When the remaining four join the force, the Tu-142 will be decommissioned.

Dornier 228
Indian Navy operates 27 Dornier 228 and in process to induct 8 more state-of-the-art Dornier for anti-submarine warfare and maritime patrol from Hindustan Aeronautics Limited. These aircraft are equipped with advanced sensors, glass cockpit, advanced surveillance radar, ELINT, optical sensors and networking features. Currently 4 of Dornier 228 NG aircraft in service in INAS 314.

Ilyushin Il-38
Indian Navy operates 5 Il-38 planes but two were lost in a mid-air collision in 2002. Currently they are being upgraded to use the Sea Dragon avionics suite.

Helicopters

HAL Dhruv; developed by Hindustan Aeronautics Limited, the Navy received its first Dhruvs on 28 March 2002. It is expected to receive a total of 120 units to replace the Chetak helicopters in service. The anti-submarine version of the helicopter is fitted with dunking sonar, torpedoes, depth charges. The helicopter may also be fitted with the missiles for anti-ship roles. However, in 2008, the Indian Navy pronounced Dhruv unsuitable for its role as an ASW platform. Indian Navy will continue to procure Dhruv as a multi-role utility platform. During the commissioning ceremony Vice Admiral Sinha said that "In the Navy, Dhruv helicopters have transformed into an advanced search and rescue (SAR) helicopter also used for missions like heliborne operations, and armed patrol with night vision devices. Such machines in the inventory have become imperative for the Navy given the scenario of low-intensity maritime operations (LIMO) and coastal security construct." In 2013 Indian Navy showed keen interest in the armed version of the HAL Rudra. The Navy may induct 20 more helicopters into service. A new squadron INAS 323 Harriers was commissioned with HAL Dhruv MKIII variant. Navy placed order for 16 MKIII helicopters and 6 of them are delivered with the remaining 10 to be delivered by Dec 2021. Naval variant of MKIII comes with 19 specific systems suited for maritime role.

Kamov Ka-25, Kamov Ka-28, and the Kamov Ka-31: The Ka-25 was acquired by the Indian Navy in 1980 for anti-submarine warfare, but had severe technological limitations. The Ka-28s were acquired in the mid-80s and were said to be a quantum leap over their predecessors from an ASW standpoint. The Ka-31 takes the Kamov capabilities even further by enabling real-time network-centric warfare for the Indian Navy.

Westland Sea King and the Sikorsky SH-3 Sea King: Used principally for anti-submarine warfare (ASW) and search & rescue roles, the helicopter fleet operate from INS Garuda (Kochi) as well as INS Shikra air stations. US sanctions on India in response to India's nuclear tests resulted in a large part of the Sea King fleet being grounded for want of spare parts. Seventeen of the Sea King helicopters will be upgraded. The upgrade will feature day and night capability, the capability to work in adverse weather conditions, integration of two anti-ship missiles with a range of fifty kilometers and a new radar.

Aérospatiale SA 316 Alouette III: Also known as the Chetak, these choppers have seen active service in the Navy as well as the Coast Guard. They are carried on several combatants as well as non-combatant ships. They are also operated from and maintained at the INS Shikra and INS Utkrosh Naval Air Stations in Mumbai and Port Blair respectively.

MH-60R helicopters –  The Indian navy is purchasing 24 MH-60R helicopters to replace its Sea king ASW fleet. On 17 July 2021 first 2 helicopters were inducted in service 22 more to be delivered soon.

UAVs
The Indian Navy operates at least two squadrons of Heron and Searcher Mk-II UAVs, based in Kochi (INAS 342) and Porbandar (INAS 343). There are plans to have at least two more squadrons of UAVs. UAVs are controlled from ships to increases the range of surveillance. There are plans to introduce rotary UAVs into the Indian Navy. These UAVs will have higher endurance and load carrying capability resulting in better reconnaissance capabilities. Indian Navy operates 2 leased MQ-9 Reaper for maritime surveillance in the Indian Ocean region.

Future aircraft

 Fixed-wing aircraft

 HAL TEDBF: This aircraft will feature canard and with significantly higher weapons payload, range and safety margin at sea is underway. The HAL has mock up with its scale model during Aero India 2021. It will also have an Air force version.
 HAL HJT-36 trainer aircraft to replace the older HAL Kiran.
Medium Range Maritime Reconnaissance Aircraft: The Indian Navy issued an RFP for six medium-range maritime reconnaissance (MRMR) aircraft. The possible contenders are; the ATR-72MP/ATR-42MP, the EADS C-295MPA/C-235MPA, the Dassault's Falcon 900MPA and the Embraer P-99A. The procurement number has been enhanced to 9 as per news reports in February 2012.
ShinMaywa US−2:Indian Navy intends to acquire 12 US-2 amphibian aircraft for conducting long-range search-and-rescue operations at cost of $1.65 billion. Two US-2 will be directly imported and remaining 10 will be assembled locally in India. In April 2018, Mahindra Defence signed an MoU with ShinMaywa Industries Ltd. to manufacture and assemble the aircraft, and set up MRO facility in India.
 Multi-Role Carrier Borne Fighters: In late January 2017, the Indian Navy released an international Request for Information (RFI) for 36 "Multi-Role Carrier Borne Fighters" (MRCBFs), asking for responses by mid-May. The envisaged roles include shipborne air defense, air-to-surface attack, buddy aerial refueling, reconnaissance, electronic warfare, etc. The requirements are flexible, including single- or multi-engine, short take-off but arrested recovery (STOBAR) or catapult-assisted take-off but arrested recovery (CATOBAR), or both. Armaments are to include a gun plus four beyond-visual-range air-to-air missiles and two all-aspect air-to-air missiles. Other technical capabilities and inclusions are to be assessed. The main contest is between Boeing F/A-18E/F Super Hornet and Dassault Rafale-M.
Dornier 228 - Indian Navy plans to acquire 12 state-of-the-art Dornier 228 NG for anti-submarine warfare and maritime patrol. These aircraft will be equipped with advanced sensors, glass cockpit, advanced surveillance radar, ELINT, optical sensors and networking features.

Helicopters

 In August 2017, the Indian Navy floated request-for-information for 123 naval multi-role helicopters (NMRHs) and 111 naval utility helicopters (NUHs).
 V-22 Osprey – with Boeing BDS: In 2015 the Indian Aviation Research Centre (ARC) became interested in acquiring V-22s for personnel evacuation in hostile conditions, logistic supplies, and deployment of the Special Frontier Force (SFF) in border areas. India had seen it perform in relief operations of the April 2015 Nepal earthquake. Elements of the Indian Navy have also looked at the V-22 rather than the E-2D for Airborne early warning and control to replace the short-range Kamov Ka-31.

UAVs
 The IAI-HAL NRUAV is a requirement for an unmanned helicopter capable of conducting ISR missions.
 In June 2017, US administration cleared sale of 22 Sea Guardian drones to India.

Structure
Flag Officer Naval Aviation (FONA) controls training, maintenance and other functions of naval aviation. Aircraft yards at Kochi, Kerala and Dabolim, Goa are responsible for maintaining the fleet's air arm. An exclusive base, INS Shikra for helicopters was commissioned in Mumbai.

To protect and preserve India's growing trade with Southeast Asia and offer a defence against increasing Chinese naval presence in the Bay of Bengal, a new naval base is being built near Visakhapatnam. It is expected to be capable of harbouring two aircraft carriers, including the planned new Vikrant-class aircraft carrier. There are two more naval air stations, INS Rajali and INS Parundu in Tamil Nadu.

Southern Command has at least one airfield, INS Garuda, in Kochi, Kerala. The Hindu reported on 2 February 2009 that a new airbase will be set up in Muscat, Oman to tackle piracy in the Gulf of Aden. Three years later in 2012 it is not clear whether any action has been taken on this proposal.
The southernmost naval air station, INS Bazz was formally opened on 31 July 2012 by the Chief of the Indian Navy at Cambell Bay in Andaman and Nicobar Islands. With the commissioning of this station, the country acquired increased capability to keep vigil on the vital maritime channel of the Straits of Malacca.

Notable members
Four naval aviators have risen to become the Chief of the Naval Staff (CNS) - Admirals R. H. Tahiliani, Arun Prakash, Sureesh Mehta and Karambir Singh.

 Admiral Radhakrishna Hariram Tahiliani - the first naval aviator to serve as Chief of the Naval Staff.
 Vice Admiral Mihir K. Roy - the first observer of the Indian Navy and the first aviator to command the aircraft carrier .
 Admiral Arun Prakash - the first Commander-in-Chief of the Andaman and Nicobar Command and the second aviator to rise to be CNS.
 Vice Admiral Shekhar Sinha - the first naval aviator to serve as Chief of Integrated Defence Staff.
Admiral Karambir Singh - the first helicopter aviator to become Chief of the Naval Staff (India)

See also

 Indian navy related lists
 List of active aircraft of the Indian Naval Air Arm
 List of Indian Navy bases
 List of active Indian Navy ships
 List of ships of the Indian Navy
 List of submarines of the Indian Navy

 Other Indian navy related
 Naval ranks and insignia of India
 Indian maritime history
 Future of the Indian Navy
 Indian Coast Guard
 Middle Ground Coastal Battery
 Naval Aviation Museum (Goa)
 Naval Aircraft Museum (Kolkata)

 Indian military related 
Army Aviation Corps (India)
 India-China Border Roads
 Indian military satellites
 List of active Indian military aircraft
 List of Indian Air Force stations
 India's overseas military bases
 Indian Nuclear Command Authority

References

External links

Indian Navy Pilot training facility at US NAS Kingsville, Texas, USA
 Naval Air Arm
 Indian Naval Aviation – Part 1 @ ACIG.org
 Indian Naval Aviation – Part 2 @ ACIG.org
 Naval Tejas, lca-tejas.org
 Documentary on YouTube on the INS Vikrant
 Video of IL-38 of IN firing anti-ship missile
 YouTube video by user vishv with some good photographs
 INS Vikrant docked in Mumbai
 Image of Kamov helicopter
 

Indian Navy
 
Naval aviation services
Naval Air Arm
Units of the Indian Peace Keeping Force